Lasse Nilsen (born 21 February 1995) is a Norwegian football defender who currently plays for the Norwegian First Division side Tromsø IL.

He hails from Bleik and started his youth career in Høken, moving on to Andenes around his early teens. He then went to the regional great team Tromsø IL, with whom he signed a professional contract in April 2014. He plays as a left back or winger.

He made his first team debut in the 2014 Norwegian First Division, which ended with Tromsø being promoted, and made his first-tier debut in May 2015 against Odd.

In April 2018, he scored his first goal against Ranheim IL in a 4-0 win. He also scored the deciding goal in a 2-1 win against Rosenborg BK in June 2018.

Career statistics

Club

References

External links
 

1995 births
Living people
People from Andøy
Norwegian footballers
Tromsø IL players
Tromsdalen UIL players
Norwegian First Division players
Eliteserien players
Association football defenders
Sportspeople from Nordland